Yves Mézard (Miramas, 3 July 1932 - Plan-d'Orgon, 7 January 2018), was a French rugby league player in the 1950s and 1960s. 

He played his entire club career for Cavaillon with which he disputed the French Championship.

Thanks to his club performances, he was selected to play for France in 1960. Being the only representative of his club, he played the 1960 Rugby League World Cup.

Biography 
Being the only representative for Cavaillon, he was part of the 18 players called up to represent France at the 1960 Rugby League World Cup in England.
Outside the pitches, he worked as a railroad employee.

Honours

International caps

References

Bibliography

External links 
 Yves Mézard at rugbyleagueproject.com

1932 births
2018 deaths
France national rugby league team players
French rugby league coaches
Sportspeople from Provence-Alpes-Côte d'Azur
Rugby league second-rows